Anthony Longdon is a Grenadian boxer. He competed in the men's light heavyweight event at the 1984 Summer Olympics.

References

External links
 

Year of birth missing (living people)
Living people
Light-heavyweight boxers
Grenadian male boxers
Olympic boxers of Grenada
Boxers at the 1984 Summer Olympics
Place of birth missing (living people)